Stephen Robertson is a British computer scientist. He is known for his work on probabilistic information retrieval together with Karen Spärck Jones and the Okapi BM25 weighting model.

Okapi BM25 is very successful in experimental search evaluations and found its way in many information retrieval systems and products, including open source search systems like Lucene, Lemur, Xapian, and Terrier. BM25 is used as one of the most important signals in large web search engines, certainly in Microsoft Bing, and probably in other web search engines too. BM25 is also used in various other Microsoft products such as Microsoft SharePoint and SQL Server.

After completing his undergraduate degree in mathematics at Cambridge University, he took an MS at City University, and then worked for ASLIB. He earned his PhD at University College London in 1976 under the renowned statistician and scholar B. C. Brookes. He then returned to City University working there from 1978 until 1998 in the Department of Information Science, continuing as a part-time professor and subsequently as professor emeritus. He is also a fellow of Girton College, Cambridge University. Now retired, Robertson is Professor Emeritus at City University, and a Visiting Professor in the Department of Computer Science at UCL.

References

Publications 
 
 

British computer scientists
Alumni of University College London
Fellows of Girton College, Cambridge
Living people
Alumni of City, University of London
Academics of City, University of London
Information retrieval researchers
1946 births